Ernst Niekisch (23 May 1889 – 23 May 1967) was a German writer and politician. Initially a member of the Social Democratic Party (SPD), he later became a prominent exponent of National Bolshevism.

Early life
Born in Trebnitz (Silesia), and brought up in Nördlingen, he became a schoolteacher by profession. He joined the Social Democratic Party in 1917 and was instrumental in the setting up of a short-lived Bavarian Soviet Republic in 1919. Indeed, for a time at the start of the year, after the resignation of Kurt Eisner and immediately before the establishment of the Bavarian Soviet Republic, Niekisch wielded effective power as chairman of the central executive of Bavarian councils, an interim governing body. He left the SPD soon afterward and was the Independent Social Democratic Party of Germany (USPD) for a time before he returned to his former party. He served a brief spell in prison in 1925 for his part in the abortive Bavarian coup.

Nationalism

In the 1920s, he stressed the importance of nationalism and attempted to turn the SPD in that direction. He was so vehemently opposed to the Dawes Plan, the Locarno Treaties and the general pacifism of the SPD that he was expelled from the party in 1926.

Upon his expulsion, Niekisch joined the Old Social Democratic Party of Saxony, which he influenced to his own nationalist form of socialism. He launched his own journal, Widerstand (Resistance), and he and his followers adopted the name of "National Bolsheviks" and looked to the Soviet Union as a continuation of both Russian nationalism and the old state of Prussia. The movement took the slogan of "Sparta-Potsdam-Moscow". He was a member of ARPLAN (Association for the Study of Russian Planned Economy) with Ernst Jünger, Georg Lukács, Karl Wittfogel and Friedrich Hielscher, under whose auspices he visited the Soviet Union in 1932. He reacted favourably to Jünger's publication Der Arbeiter, which he saw as a blueprint for a National Bolshevik Germany. He also believed in the necessity of a German-Soviet alliance against the "decadent West" and the Treaty of Versailles. The attempt to combine ultranationalism and communism, two extreme ends of the political spectrum, caused Niekisch's National Bolsheviks to be a force with little support.

Third Reich
Although anti-Jewish and in favour of a totalitarian state, Niekisch rejected Adolf Hitler, who he felt lacked any real socialism, and Niekisch instead looked to Joseph Stalin and the industrial development of the Soviet Union as his model for the Führerprinzip. Writing in 1958, Niekisch condemned Hitler as a power-obsessed demagogue who was an enemy of the elitist spirit that Niekisch advocated. He was particularly ill-disposed towards Joseph Goebbels and, at a meeting between the two facilitated by their mutual friend, Arnolt Bronnen, Niekisch and Goebbels had almost come to blows. Bronnen would break from Niekisch in 1932 after the latter published the pamphlet Hitler - ein deutsches Verhängnis, with Bronnen considering the attack on Nazism a personal insult. In the immediate aftermath of the Reichstag fire, his house was searched for evidence of any involvement, but that was not pursued. He also discussed his opposition to the new regime with Ulrich von Hassell although Niekisch did not join the German Resistance.

Despite his criticisms of Nazism, he was allowed to continue editing Widerstand until the paper was banned in December 1934. He was allowed to visit Rome in 1935 and held meetings with Benito Mussolini, who told Niekisch that he considered Hitler's aggressive stances towards the Soviet Union to be foolish and would later discuss opposition groups with the Italian Consul General while Italo-German relations were somewhat strained.

He was arrested in 1937 by the Gestapo and was sentenced, two years later, to life imprisonment at the Volksgerichtshof for 'literary high treason'. Following the intervention of his former ally, Jünger, his family could retain his property but not secure Niekisch's release. He was released in 1945, when he had become blind.

Later life
Embittered against nationalism by his wartime experiences, he turned to orthodox Marxism and lectured in sociology in Humboldt University in East Germany until 1953 when, disillusioned by the brutal suppression of the workers' uprising, he relocated to West Berlin, where he died in 1967.

Legacy
Subsequent to his death, Niekisch was one of a number of writers, including the likes of Oswald Spengler, Arthur Moeller van den Bruck, Vilfredo Pareto and Carl Schmitt, whose works were promulgated by the likes of the Groupement de recherche et d'études pour la civilisation européenne and others involved in the Conservative Revolutionary movement.

Works
 Der Weg der deutschen Arbeiterschaft zum Staat. Verlag der Neuen Gesellschaft, Berlin 1925.
 Grundfragen deutscher Außenpolitik. Verlag der Neuen Gesellschaft, Berlin 1925.
 Gedanken über deutsche Politik. Widerstands-Verlag, Dresden 1929.
 Politik und Idee. Widerstands-Verlag Anna Niekisch, Dresden 1929.
 Entscheidung. Widerstands-Verlag, Berlin 1930.
 Der politische Raum deutschen Widerstandes. Widerstands-Verlag, Berlin 1931.
 Hitler - ein deutsches Verhängnis. Drawings by A. Paul Weber. Widerstands-Verlag, Berlin 1932.
 Im Dickicht der Pakte. Widerstands-Verlag, Berlin 1935.
 Die dritte imperiale Figur. Widerstands-Verlag 1935.
 Deutsche Daseinsverfehlung. Aufbau-Verlag Berlin 1946, 3. Edition Fölbach Verlag, Koblenz 1990, .
 Europäische Bilanz. Rütten & Loening, Potsdam 1951.
 Das Reich der niederen Dämonen. Rowohlt, Hamburg 1953.
 Gewagtes Leben. Begegnungen und Begebnisse. Kiepenheuer & Witsch, Köln und Berlin 1958.
 Die Freunde und der Freund. Joseph E. Drexel zum 70. Geburtstag, 6. Juni 1966., Verlag Nürnberger Presse, Nürnberg 1966.
 Erinnerungen eines deutschen Revolutionärs. Verlag Wissenschaft und Politik, Köln.
 Volume 1: Gewagtes Leben 1889–1945. 1974, .
 Volume 2: Gegen den Strom 1945–1967. 1974, .

See also
 Karl Otto Paetel

References

External links
 Niekisch Translation Project
 

1889 births
1967 deaths
People from Trzebnica
People from the Province of Silesia
Social Democratic Party of Germany politicians
Independent Social Democratic Party politicians
Old Social Democratic Party of Germany politicians
Communist Party of Germany politicians
Socialist Unity Party of Germany politicians
Members of the Provisional Volkskammer
Members of the 1st Volkskammer
Cultural Association of the GDR members
Union of Persecutees of the Nazi Regime members
National Bolsheviks
Conservative Revolutionary movement
German fascists
German revolutionaries
German resistance members
German prisoners sentenced to life imprisonment
Academic staff of the Humboldt University of Berlin
People convicted of treason against Germany
Prisoners sentenced to life imprisonment by Germany